Mladen Galić (born 9 October 1987) is a Serbian footballer of Bosnian descent, who plays as a forward.

Club career
Born in Bosanski Novi, SR Bosnia and Herzegovina, then still within Yugoslavia, now known as Novi Grad within Republika Srpska, Galić spent most of his career playing in Serbia. Initially he played third tier clubs such as Metalac Futog, Sopot and Sloga Temerin, before joining Proleter Novi Sad in 2011. After one season with Proleter playing in the Serbian First League (second tier), Galić moved to France and played with Pau FC in the 2012–13 CFA. Then he returned to Serbia and played with Banat Zrenjanin in the Serbian League Vojvodina, before moving to Austria in summer 2014 to play with SC Röthis. In summer 2015 he joined ambitious Serbian side OFK Bačka and achieved with them their historical first time promotion to the Serbian SuperLiga, after finishing second in the 2015–16 Serbian First League. Galić made his debut in the 2016–17 Serbian SuperLiga in the first-round game against powerhouse Partizan, a game which ended in a 0–0 draw.

References

1987 births
Living people
People from Novi Grad, Bosnia and Herzegovina
Serbs of Bosnia and Herzegovina
Association football forwards
Serbian footballers
FK Sopot players
FK Sloga Temerin players
FK Proleter Novi Sad players
FK Banat Zrenjanin players
OFK Bačka players
FK Odžaci players
FK TSC Bačka Topola players
Serbian First League players
Serbian SuperLiga players
Championnat National 2 players
Serbian expatriate footballers
Expatriate footballers in France
Serbian expatriate sportspeople in France
Expatriate footballers in Austria
Serbian expatriate sportspeople in Austria
Pau FC players